The following is a list of county routes in Atlantic County in the U.S. state of New Jersey.  For more information on the county route system in New Jersey as a whole, including its history, see County routes in New Jersey.

500-series county routes
In addition to those listed below, the following 500-series county routes serve Atlantic County:
CR 536, CR 540, CR 542, CR 552, CR 557, CR 559, CR 559 Alt, CR 561, CR 561 Alt, CR 563, CR 575, CR 585

Other county routes

See also

References

 
Atlantic